The List of Hawker Typhoon operators lists the countries and their air force units that have operated the aircraft:

Operators

Australia
Royal Australian Air Force
No. 451 Squadron RAAF - Three aircraft, for tropical trials.

Canada
Royal Canadian Air Force
No. 400 Squadron RCAF - Two aircraft for development work. 
No. 438 Squadron RCAF
No. 439 Squadron RCAF
No. 440 Squadron RCAF

New Zealand
485 (NZ) Squadron
486 (NZ) Squadron

United Kingdom
Royal Air Force
1 Squadron (July 1942 - April 1944)
3 Squadron (February 1943 - April 1944)
4 Squadron - Tactical Fighter Reconnaissance Unit, part of Second Tactical Air Force - used a small number of Fighter Reconnaissance (FR) Typhoons. (October 1944 - January 1945)
56 Squadron (September 1941 - May 1944)
137 Squadron (January 1944 - August 1945)
164 Squadron (January 1944 - May 1945)
168 Squadron (September 1944 - February 1945)
170 Squadron - Two aircraft for development work.
174 Squadron (April 1943 - September 1945)
175 Squadron (April 1943 - September 1945)
181 Squadron (September 1942 - September 1945)
182 Squadron (September 1942 - September 1945)
183 Squadron (November 1942 - January 1945)
184 Squadron (March 1944 - September 1945)
186 Squadron (November 1943 - February 1944)
193 Squadron (January 1943 - August 1945)
195 Squadron (November 1942 - February 1944)
197 Squadron (November 1942 - August 1945)
198 Squadron (December 1942 - September 1945)
245 Squadron (December 1942 - August 1945)
247 Squadron (January 1943 - August 1945)
257 Squadron (July 1942 - May 1945)
263 Squadron (December 1943 - August 1945)
266 Squadron (January 1942 - July 1945)
268 Squadron (July 1944 - October 1944) FR 1B
349 (Belgian) Squadron 
350 (Belgian) Squadron - Three aircraft only.
534 Squadron
542 Squadron - One aircraft (MN315)
609 Squadron (April 1942 - September 1945)
1320 ('Abdullah') Flight (May - June 1944)
Fleet Air Arm
778 Naval Air Squadron

See also
 Hawker Typhoon
 Hawker Tornado
 Hawker Tempest

References

Notes

Citations

Bibliography

 Rawlings, John D.R. Fighter Squadrons of the RAF and their Aircraft. London: Macdonald & Jane's (Publishers) Ltd., 1969 (2nd edition 1976, reprinted 1978). . (Various Squadron pages plus order of Battle 1944, pages 528-529)
 Thomas, Chris. Hawker Typhoon: Warpaint Series No. 5. Husborne Crawley, Bedfordshire, UK: Hall Park Books Ltd., 2000.  
 Thomas, Chris and Christopher Shores. The Typhoon and Tempest Story. London: Arms and Armour Press, 1988. .

Hawker Typhoon
Typhoon
Hawker aircraft